Enoploctenus is a genus of wandering spiders first described by Eugène Simon in 1897.

Species
 it contains eight species:
Enoploctenus cyclothorax (Bertkau, 1880) (type) – Brazil
Enoploctenus distinctus (Caporiacco, 1947) – Guyana
Enoploctenus inazensis (Strand, 1909) – Ecuador
Enoploctenus luteovittatus (Simon, 1898) – St. Vincent
Enoploctenus maculipes Strand, 1909 – Brazil
Enoploctenus morbidus Mello-Leitão, 1939 – Brazil
Enoploctenus pedatissimus Strand, 1909 – Ecuador, Brazil
Enoploctenus penicilliger (Simon, 1898) – St. Vincent

References

Araneomorphae genera
Ctenidae
Spiders of South America
Spiders of the Caribbean
Taxa named by Eugène Simon